Individual endurance equestrian at the 2006 Asian Games was held in Mesaieed Endurance Course, Doha, Qatar on December 14, 2006.

Schedule
All times are Arabia Standard Time (UTC+03:00)

Results
Legend
EL — Eliminated
RT — Retired
WD — Withdrawn

References
Start list

External links
Official website

Individual endurance